József Molnár (27 August 1918, Budapest, Hungary  1 December 2009, Munich, Germany) was a Hungarian writer, journalist, publisher and printer.

Biography
His mother, Mária Lagler (1886–1943), worked in Budapest as a cook, his biological father is unknown. József grew up in Csepreg with relatives of his mother. He bore his mother's maiden name and was called József Lagler until the age of fourteen, when he was adopted by Jenő Molnár. He attended the Kossuth Lajos Grammar School in Budapest.

On 1 December 1938, he became a member of the Social Democratic Party of Hungary. In 1945, he joined the National Peasant Party (Nemzeti Parasztpárt) and was elected to their executive committee. In 1947, he resigned from the party and left Hungary in November 1948. From then on he lived in exile. After arriving in Switzerland, in the summer of 1949 he earned his living in various companies as a labourer. In the further course of his emigration, József Molnár worked for several years as a political commentator at Radio Free Europe. He went on to New York and back again to Europe.

Family
In 1955, he met Olga Leibold, his future second wife. It was a conversation about the novel The Bridge of San Luis Rey by Thornton Wilder. The couple wed in September 1965 and remained together until József's death. His cremated remains are located at the Munich East Cemetery.

Work

In 1950, József Molnár joined a group of Hungarian exiles, who founded a journal of literature and politics, Látóhatár, and renamed again in 1958 as Új Látóhatár (New Horizon). He founded a printing company in Munich, where the magazine was produced over decades of outstanding quality. He was the spiritus rector of the magazine until the publication of the last issue in December 1989. From 1963, he published numerous books of Hungarian authors in his publishing house Aurora. In 1997, Molnár was honored for his life's work with the Officer's Cross of the Order of Merit of the Republic of Hungary.

He viewed himself as "a servant of letters". He spent years doing research on the Hungarian punchcutter Miklós Kis (1650–1702), and created Misztótfalusi Kis Miklós Múzeumi Alapítvány. He founded the museum in Misztótfalu, which was inaugurated and opened to the public on 8 September 1991. He was a founding member of the Academia Musicae Pro Mundo Uno in Rome. The Academia was founded in 1978 by József Juhar (a Hungarian theologian and music expert). Juhar and Molnár remained lifelong friends.

Awards
 1991 Pro Cultura Hungarica Plaquette
 1991 Bethlen Gábor Prize
 1994 Nagy Imre Memorial Award
 1997 Officer's Cross of the Order of Merit of the Hungarian Republic

Bibliography
 1996 Tanulmányok a magyar forradalomról
 2000 Misztótfalusi Kis Miklós
 2002 Áchim L. András élete és halála
 2002 A betű szolgálatában. Negyven év az Új Látóhatárért és a nyugati magyar irodalomért. Válogatott írások
 2006 Radio Free Europe in the days of the revolution
 2009 Életem (Autobiography by József Molnár)

Notes

External links
Website „Remember József Molnár“ (Photos)
Death notice József Molnár (German/Hungarian)
Látóhatár – Új Látóhatár (Hungarian)
Academia Musicae Pro Mundo Uno
Research report Kis Miklós (German)

1918 births
2009 deaths
Writers from Budapest
Social Democratic Party of Hungary politicians
National Peasant Party (Hungary) politicians
Hungarian journalists
Hungarian essayists
Male essayists
Hungarian male writers
Officer's Crosses of the Order of Merit of the Republic of Hungary (civil)
Hungarian expatriates in Switzerland
Hungarian expatriates in Germany
Radio Free Europe/Radio Liberty people
20th-century Hungarian people
20th-century essayists
20th-century journalists
Hungarian expatriates in the United States